Sikandarpur is a village in Sikandarpur Sarausi block of Unnao district, Uttar Pradesh, India. Located 10 km northwest of the city of Unnao, near the Barhota lake, it serves as the block headquarters as well as the seat of a nyaya panchayat. It is also the namesake of a historical pargana. The main crops in Sikandarpur are wheat, barley, gram, juwar, and paddy, and irrigation is largely done by wells. It has a post office and a veterinary hospital. As of 2011, its population is 4,510, in 752 households.

History 
Sikandarpur was originally called Burhanpur, but the name was changed in 1297 by Sikandar Khan, an agent of Ala-ud-Din Khilji. It later lent its name to a pargana, previously named after the neighbouring village of Sarosi; C.A. Elliott wrote in 1862 that the name change had "recently become habitual" at the time.

At the turn of the 20th century, Sikandarpur was described as one of the main villages in its namesake pargana. It had a lower primary school and a temple to Mahadeo, and its population as of 1901 was 1,727, including a Muslim minority of 263. Brahmins were the most numerous caste at the time.

References

Villages in Unnao district